Rungsak Kothcharak (born 24 November 1993), is a Thai professional footballer who plays as a left-back for Thai League 1 club Trat.

References

External links

1993 births
Living people
Rungsak Kothcharak
Association football defenders
Rungsak Kothcharak
Rungsak Kothcharak